Jindra Košťálová is a retired artistic gymnast from Czechoslovakia. She was part of the Czechoslovak team that won the 1966 World Artistic Gymnastics Championships. Individually, she won two bronze medals, on the floor and balance beam, at the 1969 European championships.

References

External links
 

Living people
Czechoslovak female artistic gymnasts
World champion gymnasts
Medalists at the World Artistic Gymnastics Championships
Year of birth missing (living people)